Highway 317 is a highway in the Canadian province of Saskatchewan.

Major intersections
From south to north:

References

317